Gene L. Bradford (1909 – August 17, 1937) was an American politician who served as a member of the Washington House of Representatives in 1937.  She represented Washington's Washington's 39th legislative district as a Democrat.

Bradford was born in Wisconsin in 1909 but raised in Iowa.  She studied at Northwestern University in Evanston, Illinois.

Her legislative district served Snohomish and Island Counties, and she lived in Everett, Washington.  She was a member of the Daughters of the American Revolution and the Order of the Eastern Star, a Masonic organization.

She died in an automobile crash during her first year in office at the age of just 27 or 28.  She was riding at the time with State Representative Clyde U. Taylor and his wife.

References

Further reading
 “Biography, Gene Bradford,” The Seattle Times, January 17, 1937, page 11
 “Legislator, in collision, Dies,” The Seattle Times, August 17, 1937

1909 births
1937 deaths
Democratic Party members of the Washington House of Representatives
Women state legislators in Washington (state)
Northwestern University alumni
Order of the Eastern Star
Daughters of the American Revolution people